Amoghavarsha JS  is an Indian filmmaker and wildlife photographer. In 2021, Amoghavarsha won the 67th National Film Awards for his film "Wild Karnataka" as the Best Exploration/Adventure Film, It is narrated by Sir David Attenborough and also won the Best Narration/Voice Over award. He is the art director on Grammy® Award Album "Divine Tides" by Ricky Kej at the 64th Annual Grammy Awards and 65th Annual Grammy Awards. His video work on climate change was showcased in the 2015 United Nations Climate Change Conference in Paris by Indian Prime Minister Narendra Modi and French President François Hollande. He addressed the United Nations headquarters in 2020 when his movie Wild Karnataka was screened there. His film Kali has won the Impactdocs Award of Merit and the Australia India Youth Dialogue alumni grant for the year 2015

Amoghavarsha worked with the Grammy® Award Winner Ricky Kej for his music albums. The song “Mother Earth” from the album “Divine Tides” by Ricky Kej and Stewart Copeland was originally written as the score for Amoghavarsha’s film "Wild Karnataka" a tribute to the magnificent bio-diversity of the Southern Indian state of Karnataka

He has previously worked with companies such as National Geographic and BBC. Amoghavarsha is the “EOS Ambassador" for Canon. He has also appeared on the Star Plus  TED Talks India Nayi Soch hosted by Shah Rukh Khan

Early life 
After completing his bachelor's degree in Computer Science, he joined Amazon as a software engineer. He later worked for the local search startup Asklaila as its first employee. He co-founded an IOT-wellness start-up in San Francisco and holds 2 patents for the same.

In 2018 Amogh found a media production company named Mudskipper Labs which is a premium factual studio dedicated to producing films that create global impact

Photography 
Amoghavarsha works with government forest departments, non-profit organisations and media institutions on conservation and education projects. He works closely with CEE and has helped set up interpretation centres. He is also one of the key contributors to the "Science Express - Biodiversity Special", a Ministry of Environment Forest and Climate Change initiative which toured India for over a year and has been witnessed by more than 2.5 million people. He has contributed to Microsoft research on the cutting-edge digital narratives media project at Hampi.

His work has been exhibited in various national and international events. His work has also been exhibited by UGallery and Williams Sonoma.

Filming projects 
 "Indian Wildlife National Anthem" – Amoghavarsha directed a pan-India wildlife national anthem music video was launched as part of the album Shanti Samsara by Grammy winner Ricky Kej. 
 "Secrets of the King Cobra" - This National Geographic film on the world's largest venomous snake saw Amoghavarsha working as an assistant cameraman. The film follows the King Cobra into its world, revealing what it does, where it goes and who it interacts with.
 "Jaya Hai Kannada Thaye" – This music video saw Grammy winner Ricky Kej and Amoghavarsha (who not only served as Director but also as Director of Photography), joining hands. Launched on 6 regional channels, this is India’s first wildlife music video. It gained a million views in a week.
 "Huli: How to Save the Tiger? (also known as Huli: Technology to the Frontiers of Tiger Conservation)" - This short film was nominated at India's reputed wildlife film festival "CMS Vatavaran Environment and Wildlife Film Festival 2013". It sheds light on the forest staff that protects our forests as well as what goes into saving the national animal, by going deep into the BRT Tiger Reserve of Karnataka.
 "River Terns of Bhadra" - This film showcases the lives of beautiful River Terns that throng the Bhadra backwaters in the summers. It is one of India's first wildlife films to be licensed under Creative Commons (a copyright permission that grants creative work). Nominated at the CMS Vatavaran 2015 film festival, the film was made using hidden camera traps, underwater cameras and high-speed cameras. Premiering at the UB City Amphitheatre in Bangalore to celebrate Wildlife Week, the film assisted the cause of conservation.  
 "Kali"  - This award-winning film on the Kali River that flows through the Western Ghats of India, follows the journey of a 100-year-old grandmother to the source of the river. Following a univocal response from policymakers after watching the movie, the Dandeli Anshi Tiger Reserve was renamed to Kali Tiger Reserve. The movie won the Impactdocs Award of Merit in 2016.
 "Wild Karnataka"  - As India's first blue-chip natural history movie, Wild Karnataka showcases the rich biodiversity of the Indian state of Karnataka. It is narrated by Sir David Attenborough. It was released in PVR screens within India in January 2020 and was shown at a special screening at the United Nations headquarters on World Wildlife Day (March 3). Amoghavarsha co-directed this 4K ultra-HD film with Kalyan Varma. It is the first Indian wildlife film to be released in theatres  as well as one that created history by completing 50 days in the theatres.
 "Gandhada Gudi" - His latest film Gandhada Gudi starring the Late Dr Puneeth Rajkumar and himself was released on 28 October 2022 and is a unique film that explores the breathtaking beauty of Karnataka. With its captivating storyline and breathtaking cinematography, the film has become a box office hit and a top-grosser in its category in India. The film's impact extends beyond its entertainment value, as it has been watched by nearly half a million children and is considered an educational tool by educators and school authorities. The film has also made a lasting impact by inspiring tree plantation drives across the Karnataka state, particularly in schools and colleges, making it a true testament to the power of film to inspire positive change in society
 "Wild Mumbai" - This upcoming directorial venture is a project that is similar to Wild Karnataka.It will be directed by Amoghavarsha. This documentary will showcase the biodiversity of places like Aarey Colony, Sanjay Gandhi National Park and the Sewri Mudflats.

Awards and recognitions 
 His directorial film Wild Karnataka won the 67th National Film Awards for Best Exploration/Adventure Film.
 He was invited to Australia in 2013 and 2015 to represent India as part of the Australia-India Youth Dialogue.
 He was invited to Convention on Biological Diversity in 2012 to talk about the importance of photography and media in conservation education.
 He was invited by Ramesh Srinivasan to University of California, Los Angeles to present his work on use of media and technology in conservation.
 His movies, River Terns of Bhadra and Kali have both been nominated at India's top Environment and Wildlife film festival CMS Vatavaran.
 In 2020, he was a part of a panel discussion at the UN Environment Programme (along with Ricky Kej) where his film Wild Karnataka was screened on World Wildlife Day.
 Canon India announced him as their new EOS Ambassador in June 2020.

References

External links
 Amoghavarsha official website
 Mudskipper website
 Secrets of The King Cobra
 Jaya hey Kannada thaye
 Huli - How to Save the Tiger?
 Huli: Technology to the Frontiers of Tiger Conservation
 River Terns of Bhadra
 Kali
 Wild Karnataka official teaser

Indian documentary filmmakers
Nature photographers
Indian nature photographers
Artists from Bangalore
Living people
1983 births
20th-century Indian photographers